Ulrich Kienast (born 20 March 1937) is a German boxer. He competed in the men's light middleweight event at the 1956 Summer Olympics.

References

1937 births
Living people
German male boxers
Olympic boxers of the United Team of Germany
Boxers at the 1956 Summer Olympics
People from the Free City of Danzig
Sportspeople from Gdańsk
Light-middleweight boxers